Paul J. Tikalsky (born December 30, 1960) is an American engineer, academic administrator who currently serves as Dean & Donald and Cathey Humphreys Chair of Engineering at Oklahoma State University.

Early life and education
Paul Tikalsky has earned a Bachelor of Science in Civil and Environmental Engineering from University of Wisconsin–Madison in 1983. He later earned Master of Science in Structural Engineering at University of Texas at Austin in 1986 and also Doctor of Philosophy in Structural Engineering at University of Texas at Austin in 1989.

Career
He has been the dean of the College of Engineering, Architecture and Technology at Oklahoma State University (OSU) since 2012.

Honors
Tikalsky is an elected foreign member of the Czech National Academy of Engineering. He is a fellow of the American Concrete Institute, a fellow of the American Society of Civil Engineers, and received the Joe W. Kelly Award from the American Concrete Institute. He was twice named the State of Utah's Engineering Educator of the year.

References 

1960 births
Living people
University of Wisconsin–Madison alumni
 University of Wisconsin–Madison College of Engineering alumni
Santa Clara University faculty
Oklahoma State University faculty
American university and college faculty deans
Cockrell School of Engineering alumni
Pennsylvania State University faculty
Engineering academics
20th-century American engineers
21st-century American engineers
American civil engineers
American structural engineers
Fellows of the American Society of Civil Engineers
Engineers from Wisconsin
University of Texas at Austin alumni